Beatriz Castillo Phillippón (born 17 February 1954) is a Cuban sprinter. She competed in the women's 4 × 400 metres relay at the 1972 Summer Olympics. She also won a silver medal in the 4 x 400 metres relay at the 1971 Pan American Games.

References

1954 births
Living people
Athletes (track and field) at the 1972 Summer Olympics
Cuban female sprinters
Olympic athletes of Cuba
Athletes (track and field) at the 1971 Pan American Games
Pan American Games silver medalists for Cuba
Pan American Games medalists in athletics (track and field)
Sportspeople from Santiago de Cuba
Universiade bronze medalists for Cuba
Universiade medalists in athletics (track and field)
Central American and Caribbean Games medalists in athletics
Central American and Caribbean Games silver medalists for Cuba
Central American and Caribbean Games gold medalists for Cuba
Competitors at the 1978 Central American and Caribbean Games
Medalists at the 1977 Summer Universiade
Medalists at the 1971 Pan American Games
Olympic female sprinters
20th-century Cuban women
20th-century Cuban people